Bajo la misma piel (English title: Under your Skin) is a Mexican telenovela produced by Carlos Moreno Laguillo for Televisa. It is an original telenovela from Martha Carrillo. It premiered on September 15, 2003 and ended on January 16, 2004. Despite huge exposure prior to its premiere, Bajo la misma piel was only a moderate success in its country of origin, Mexico, and was a virtual flop during its airing on Univision in the United States.

The series stars Kate del Castillo, Juan Soler, Diana Bracho, Alejandro Tommasi and Alejandro Camacho.

Plot
Sara's marriage to Bruno Murillo makes her life hell on earth. Bruno, a harsh fifty-year-old man who cheats on Sara and firmly believes that money can buy everything, even love. Sara represses her frustration and sacrifices her happiness in order to give her children, Miranda, Andres, and Paula, a stable home.

To make matters worse for Sara, Bruno will not let her divorce him. Just when Sara has resigned herself to living without love, Joaquin, the love of her life, returns. Although Sara's daughter Miranda is a vivacious and intelligent young woman, she has fallen in love with a man similar to Bruno.

Her fiancé, Patricio, is an ambitious and hypocritical man who cheats on her with her sister Paula. While Bruno supports Miranda's engagement because Patricio is his best friend's son, Sara fears for their daughter's future. When she meets Alejandro, Miranda questions her feelings for Patricio because Alejandro and she share a strong attraction.

Although there are countless obstacles between them, they are determined to fight for their happiness. Regina, Sara's sister who lives with her, was once a virtuous young lady who believed in love, but her fiancé abandoned her a few days before their wedding.

Nowadays Regina wants to follow just one rule: single men only. However, Regina falls in love with Eugenio, her friend's husband, and finds that she cannot control her passion. Sara's and Regina's mother, Esther, is the only woman in the family who has experienced true love with her husband.

Although she has lost her battle against cancer, Esther does not fall into depression. With vigor and optimism she continues to support her children and granddaughter, hoping to give them the strength to find and fight for true love.

Cast
 
Kate del Castillo as Miranda Murillo Ortiz de Ruiz
Juan Soler as Alejandro Ruiz Calderón
Diana Bracho as Sara Ortiz Escalante de Murillo
Alejandro Tomassi as Eugenio Rioja
Alejandro Camacho as Bruno Murillo Valdez
Susana Zabaleta as Ivonne Acosta
Manuel Ojeda as Rodrigo Leyva
Azela Robinson as Regina Ortiz Escalante
Victor Noriega as Gabriel Ornelas
Pedro Armendáriz, Jr. as Joaquín Vidaurri
Marga López as Esther Escalante de Ortiz
Lupita Lara as Rebeca de Barraza
Mariana Karr as Alina Calderón de Ruiz
Laisha Wilkins as Paula Beltrán Ortiz
Sergio Catalán as Patricio Leyva
Ernesto D'Alessio as Andrés Murillo Ortiz
Isadora González as Norma Rioja
Andrea Torre as Roberta Barraza
Alejandro Aragón as Marcos Ruiz Calderón
Tiaré Scanda as Aurora Romero
David Ostrosky as Jaime Sandoval
Yolanda Ventura as Macarena Montiel
Alfonso Iturralde as José María Barraza
Adriana Roel as Blanca Rioja
Elizabeth Dupeyrón as Ángela Quintero
Lorenzo de Rodas as Agustín Ruiz Cañedo
María Marcela as Sonia
Mauricio Bonet as Darío Portillo
Paola Cantú as Mónica Gutiérrez
Andrés Garza as Santiago Morales Acosta
Marifer Sasián as Triana Sandoval Romero
Polo Ortín as Nicky
Manuel Landeta as Ramiro Morales
Claudio Báez as Lic. Ramón Gutiérrez
Julio Bracho as Iker Iragorri
Uberto Bondoni as Tony
Dacia Arcaráz as Érika Godínez
Eduardo Liñán as Lic. Benítez
Juan Verduzco as Aurelio Acosta
Carmela Mosso as Paquita
Juan Carlos Martin del Campo as Damian
Veronika con K. as Liz
Anabel Gutiérrez as Rosita
Maricarmen Vela as Esther and Rosita's friend
Lourdes Canale as Esther and Rosita's friend
Tere Mondragón as Esther and Rosita's friend
Sara Montes as Esther's friend
Estela Aceves as Secretary
José Luis Avendaño as Jerónimo
Aline Blanc as Elena
Jorge Alberto Bolaños as Comandante Navarro
Claudia Cervantes as Patricio's friend
Alberto Chávez as Barman
Benjamín Islas as Police
Mario León as Hugo's friend in jail
Jaime Lozano as Comandante Zúñiga
Beatriz Monroy as Jerónimo's wife
Antonio Muñiz as Jimmy
Luis Romo as Aldo
Gabriel Roustand as Police
Miguel Serros as Recluso
Silvia Valdez as Nurse
Ricardo Vera as Lawyer
Sharis Cid as Vanessa
Ricky Mergold
Adanely Núñez

Awards and nominations

References

External links

 at esmas.com 

2003 telenovelas
Mexican telenovelas
2003 Mexican television series debuts
2004 Mexican television series endings
Spanish-language telenovelas
Television shows set in Mexico
Televisa telenovelas